Mint is the debut studio album by German-Canadian singer Alice Merton, released on 18 January 2019 through Paper Planes and Mom + Pop Music. It includes the singles "No Roots" and "Lash Out", which were previously included on the No Roots EP, "Why So Serious", released on 7 September 2018, "Funny Business", released on 30 November 2018, and “Learn to Live” released on 15 January 2019.

Merton re-released the album in late 2019 under the title "Mint +4", with the addition of 4 new songs, including the sixth single "Easy".

Critical reception

The New York Times called the album a "rousing take on centrist 1980s pop with a disco tempo and the faintest texture of Southern rock. Which is to say: Haim, watch out."

Singles
In addition to "No Roots", which reached number one on the US Alternative Songs chart, Merton spoke to Billboard about an additional single to be included on the album: "It's one of my favorites at the moment. I could listen to it all the time... We'll probably be releasing it in November. When I wrote it, I was like, yeah this is fun."

The album's third single is "Why So Serious", which was accompanied by a video of Merton seeing strange things as she walks down a street. Merton has stated that the song came about as a "response to the press' questions about being a one-hit wonder [after 'No Roots'] and embracing her individuality through music and a small team".

Track listing
All tracks produced by Nicolas Rebscher, except "Lash Out", produced alongside Dave Bassett and "Funny Business" produced by John Hill.

Charts

References

2019 debut albums
Alice Merton albums